Ygre Station is a railway station on the Bergensbanen railway line.  It is located at the village of Ygre in Voss municipality, Vestland county, Norway. The station is served by the Bergen Commuter Rail, operated by Vy Tog, with up to five daily departures in each direction. The station was opened in 1908. The station building is the former building at Nesttun station that had grown too small and was moved here.

The station is accessible via County Road 307, which runs parallel to the Bergen Line, and County Road 308 branches off to the north immediately west of the station.

External links
 Jernbaneverket's page on Ygre

Railway stations in Voss
Railway stations on Bergensbanen
Railway stations opened in 1908
1908 establishments in Norway